David Williams (November 21, 1950 – March 6, 2009) was an American guitarist, singer, songwriter and producer, best known as a prominent session guitarist for stars like Madonna and Michael Jackson.

Career
Williams grew up in Newport News, Virginia. At a young age he was influenced by jazz artists such as Kenny Burrell and Wes Montgomery. He later started up his professional music career with the Dells. This career path was halted when he went on to serve in the Vietnam War. Upon his return in 1972 he moved to Los Angeles to reunite with the Dells. Williams also worked with the Temptations at that point. He thereafter established, with bassist James Jamerson, Jr., the R&B group Chanson. Chanson went on to release the 1978 single "Don't Hold Back" which rose to No. 21, #11 and No. 8 on the Hot 100, Dance Club and Hot R&B Songs charts respectively.

Steadily growing success didn't begin until he was brought to Michael Jackson's attention by Everett "Blood" Hollins, who had heard Chanson on the radio and was impressed with Williams' guitar playing. He was hired to play on Jackson's 1979 album Off the Wall. He was also featured on every song but one (second only to Tito Jackson) for the Jacksons' 1980 album Triumph; and played on the Jacksons' 1981 concert tour and it's accompanying album, The Jacksons Live!

Williams became a popular session guitarist, playing on albums by the Pointer Sisters (1980), Peter Allen (1980), Aretha Franklin (1980) and the Four Tops (1981). In 1982, he was used once again on Michael Jackson's Thriller album, where his signature funky strumming and a minimalist solo famously anchor "Billie Jean". Williams also performed on Jackson's album Bad (1987) with hit songs, such as "Bad", "Dirty Diana" and "Smooth Criminal".

After the success of these projects Williams became one of the most in-demand pop music union session guitarists for the next decade, recording again with Aretha Franklin or with Madonna, Julio Iglesias, George Benson, the Manhattan Transfer, Michael McDonald, Melissa Manchester, the Temptations, Stevie Nicks, Rod Stewart, Dionne Warwick, Shalamar, Go West, ABC, Boz Scaggs, Karen Carpenter, Mariah Carey, Julian Lennon, Bryan Ferry, Paul McCartney, Johnny Mathis, Del Shannon, Chaka Khan, Paul Hardcastle, Kenny Loggins, Steve Perry, Lionel Richie, Jessica Simpson, Diana Ross, the Crusaders, Andraé Crouch, Eddie Murphy, Herbie Hancock, Peter Cetera, Whitney Houston, Monkey Business and more.

He made a contribution to the film world with his singing lead on the song "No Negatives of You" which he co-composed with Bill Kinzi and A. Shapiro. It was used in the Nico Mastorakis 1987 directed comedy Terminal Exposure. Unfortunately it wasn't included in the soundtrack which was released by Notefornote Entertainment on August 12, 2022.

Though he played on a number of tours with Michael Jackson, Madonna and others, Williams remained a behind-the-scenes union session player. Williams died of cardiac arrest on March 6, 2009, in Hampton, Virginia at age 58, about three months before Michael Jackson's death.

Personal life
He is the father of former Lizzie McGuire and Raise Your Voice star Davida Williams, and singer Dana Williams.

Discography
Solo albums
 Take the Ball and Run (1983)
 Somethin' Special (1991)

References

External links

Obituary published in "The Daily Press" 10 March 2009
David Williams at IMDb

1950 births
2009 deaths
20th-century American guitarists
21st-century American guitarists
Rhythm guitarists
Musicians from Newport News, Virginia
American male guitarists
American session musicians
African-American record producers
African-American guitarists
Record producers from Virginia
20th-century American male musicians
21st-century American male musicians
Guitarists from Virginia
American rock guitarists
Lead guitarists
American soul guitarists
American rhythm and blues guitarists
American funk guitarists
20th-century African-American musicians
21st-century African-American musicians